San José Cancasque is a municipality in the Chalatenango department of El Salvador.

Geography
The community is located to the south of the city of Chalatenango. It is a neighbour to the communities of San Isidro Labrador to the North and Potonico and San Miguel de Mercedes located to the East. Lake Suchitlán is located a few kilometers to the South.

Economy
Most of the residents of San Jose Cancasque are employed as rural labourers and livestock farmers.

Municipalities of the Chalatenango Department